Jon Morcillo Conesa (born 15 September 1998) is a Spanish professional footballer who plays as a left winger for Athletic Bilbao.

Club career

Early career
Born in Amorebieta-Etxano, Biscay, Basque Country to a Basque father and a mother from Cartagena, Region of Murcia, Morcillo represented SD Amorebieta and SCD Durango as a youth. He made his senior debut with the latter's first team on 1 May 2016, in a 2–0 Tercera División away loss against CD Vitoria.

Athletic Bilbao
In June 2016, Morcillo joined Athletic Bilbao at the age of 17, being initially assigned to the farm team also in the regional fourth division. Promoted to the reserves in June 2018, he made his Segunda División B debut for them on 25 August of that year, playing the last four minutes of a 2–0 home win over CD Tudelano.

Morcillo scored his first goal for the B side on 25 November 2018, opening the 1–1 draw at Barakaldo CF. He emerged as an important player during the 2019–20 season by contributing ten goals, including one from the halfway line in a 3–0 away victory against Tudelano on 22 September 2019.

On 8 May 2020, Morcillo renewed his contract with the Lions until 2023, being subsequently called up to pre-season with the main squad. He made his first-team – and La Liga – debut on 12 September, three days before his 22nd birthday, playing the full 90 minutes of a 2–0 away defeat to Granada CF. He was definitely promoted to the first team in October, being given the number 2 jersey. 

Morcillo featured intermittently across his maiden campaign, coming off the bench against Real Madrid and FC Barcelona as Athletic beat both rivals to claim the 2020–21 Supercopa de España in January 2021, but not selected in the squad for the 2020 final of the Copa del Rey (delayed due to the COVID-19 pandemic in Spain) three months later, which ended in defeat to Real Sociedad. Having scored in the quarter-final penalty shootout and assisted the decisive goal in the semi-finals of the Spanish Cup, he was named among the substitutes for the 2021 final which took place on 17 April, just two weeks after the previous edition; he did not get on the field in the 4–0 loss to Barcelona. 

On 28 April 2021, Morcillo scored his first league goal, in a 2–2 draw at home to Real Valladolid. The following January he was loaned to that side, now playing in the Segunda División, until the end of the season.

International career
Morcillo won caps for the unofficial Basque Country team, making his debut against Costa Rica in November 2020.

Career statistics

Club

Honours
Athletic Bilbao
Supercopa de España: 2020–21
Copa del Rey runner-up: 2020–21

References

External links

1998 births
Living people
People from Amorebieta-Etxano
Sportspeople from Biscay
Spanish footballers
Footballers from the Basque Country (autonomous community)
Association football wingers
La Liga players
Segunda División players
Segunda División B players
Tercera División players
SD Amorebieta footballers
CD Basconia footballers
Bilbao Athletic footballers
Athletic Bilbao footballers
Real Valladolid players
Basque Country international footballers